Agha Mir Suleman Dawood Jan Ahmedzai (Balochi: آغا میر سلیمان داوود خان احمدزی) is the 35th Khan of Kalat, a position he has held since the death of his father, Mir Dawood Jan, in 1998. Currently he lives in self-imposed exile in Wales. His only son, Prince Mir Mohammad Khan Ahmadzai, is estranged from him. Both Mir Suleman Dawood and his son had applied for asylum but his son later rebelled and withdrew his asylum request. After that Mir Mohammad Khan Ahmadzai left his father and returned to Pakistan. Upon his arrival to Pakistan, he hoisted Pakistani flag at the Quaid-e-Azam’s Residency in Ziarat. Currently, Mir Mohammad Khan Ahmadzai regularly hosts senior figures of law-enforcement in Balochistan at the same place where his father used to hold court.

Mir Suleman Dawood is the 35th Khan of Kalat.  Ethnic Baloch by origin. His mother tongue is Brahvi while he also speaks Balochi, Urdu and English fluently. Mir Suleman Dawood received his initial education in Lahore and Quetta. He got his early education at Aitchison College in Lahore (1972–1983).

Mir Suleman Dawood has lived in exile in Cardiff, Wales, occasionally traveling to London. Officially, the Government of Pakistan does not recognize his authority, but his voice still carries tremendous weight with much of the populace, and leading politicians like Chief Minister Abdul Malik Baloch and Sanaullah Zehri have asked him to return to Pakistan to pacify the restless Baloch. Mir Suleman Dawood Jan's Uncle who is also his father-in-law and his younger brothers, Prince Mohyuddin Baloch (Uncle) and Prince Faisal Dawood and Prince Umer Daud Khan, are politicians in Pakistan.

References

Khans of Kalat
Living people
Pakistani emigrants to Wales
People from Kalat District
Princely rulers of Pakistan
Welsh people of Baloch descent
Nawabs of Pakistan
Year of birth missing (living people)
Aitchison College alumni